Joshua Hale Fialkov (born August 19, 1979) is an American comic book writer who primarily works in the horror genre.  He is best known for Echoes, The Bunker, Elk's Run, I, Vampire, and the 2008 film Infected.  He has been nominated for multiple Harvey Awards.

Early life
Fialkov was born in Sacramento, California, on 19 August 1979, but raised in Pittsburgh, Pennsylvania. He attended college at Emerson in Boston, Massachusetts, where he received a B.F.A. in writing and directing.  After working in film in Boston, he moved to Los Angeles in 2001.

Career
In 2007, he was a winner in the first Pilot Season comics competition with Cyblade, and returned for the fifth season in 2011 with The Test.

In late 2013, Fialkov started to write a new webcomic series The Bunker with artist Joe Infurnari, which received positive reactions and was picked up by Oni Press to turn the series into a traditional printed format starting from February 2014. The publisher also picked up another pitch from Fialkov and a rookie artist Gabo, St. Jude and The Life After, which debuted in July 2014 as The Life After and was also critically praised. Following the breakthrough success of two independent series, because of the resulting increased workflow, his own illness in late July, and possibly low sales of the series itself, Fialkov dropped out of Ultimate FF, leaving the series cancelled midway through the current arc.

Outside the comics realm, in 2008, his success in comics led to his selection as lead writer and executive producer for the LG15: The Resistance web series, based on the lonelygirl15 franchise.

Personal life
In an August 2014 question and answer thread on the website Reddit, Fialkov noted that he is an atheist.

Bibliography

References

External links
 
 www.thefialkov.com (Official website)

1979 births
American comics artists
Living people
Writers from Pittsburgh
Emerson College alumni